Central Synagogue may refer to:

Argentina
 Central Synagogue of Buenos Aires

Australia
 Central Synagogue (Sydney)

Israel
 Yeshurun Central Synagogue

Syria
 Central Synagogue of Aleppo

United Kingdom
 Birmingham Central Synagogue
 Central Synagogue (Great Portland Street) (London)
 East London Central Synagogue

United States
 Central Synagogue (Manhattan)